Pauline is a female given name.  It was originally the French form of Paulina, a female version of Paulinus, a variant of Paulus meaning the little, hence the younger.

The corresponding form for the name in Italian is Paolina (Paula corresponds to Paola). In Russian, the corresponding name is Павли́на (pronounced Pavlína). In French, other diminutives of Paula exist, namely Paulette and Pauletta.

People

Pauline Adams (1874–1958), Irish-American suffragist
Pauline Ado (b. 1991), French professional surfer
Pauline Alderman (1893–1983), US musicologist and composer
Pauline Allen (b. 1948), Australian scholar of early Christianity
Pauline Allen-Dean, Bahamian former banker
Pauline Amos, British performance artist
Pauline Armitage, Northern Ireland former politician
Pauline Ashwell, pseudonym of British author Pauline Whitby (1928-2015)
Pauline Auzou (1775–1835), French painter
Pauline Morrow Austin (1916–2011), US meteorologist
Pauline Baards, a stage name of Italian actor Paola Barbara (1912–1989)
Pauline Irene Batebe, Ugandan engineer
Pauline Baynes (1922–2008), English illustrator
Pauline Bebe (b. 1965), French rabbi
Pauline Bell (1912-2010), winner of the second Scripps National Spelling Bee champion
Pauline Benda (1877–1985), French actress better known as Simone Le Bargy
Pauline Bennett (b. 1964), British DJ and rapper also known as Jazzi P
Pauline Bern (b. 1952), New Zealand jeweller
Pauline Betz (1919–2011), US professional tennis player
Pauline Bewick (1935–2022), Irish artist
Pauline Bird-Hart (b. 1957), British rower
Pauline Biscarat (b. 1989), French rugby sevens player
Pauline Black (b. 1953), English singer
Pauline Bøgelund (b. 1996), Danish handball player
Pauline Bonaparte (1780–1825), Italian noble
Pauline Boty (1938–1966), British painter
Pauline Boutal (1894–1992), French-born Canadian artist, theatrical designer, actress and educator
Pauline Browes (b. 1938), a Canadian former politician
Pauline Powell Burns (1872–1912), African-American artist
Pauline Cassin Caro (1828/34/35 - 1901), French novelist
Pauline Chalamet (b. 1992), American actress, writer, and director
Pauline Atherton Cochrane (born 1929), American librarian 
Pauline Collins (b. 1940), English actress
Pauline Marie Armande Craven (1808–1891), French author
Pauline Croze (b. 1979), French singer and musician
Pauline Cushman (1833–1893), US actress and spy
Pauline Davis (politician) (1917–1995), US politician
Pauline Davis-Thompson (b. 1966), former Bahamian sprinter
Pauline de Rothschild (1908–1976), writer and fashion designer
Pauline Donalda (1882–1970), Canadian singer
Pauline Ducruet (b. 1994), Monegasque noble
Dame Pauline Engel (1930–2017), New Zealand educator and Catholic nun
Pauline Fisk (1948–2015), British children's author
Pauline Flanagan (1925–2003), Irish actress
Pauline Fréchette (1889-1943), poet, dramatist, journalist, nun
Pauline Frederick (1883–1938), US actor
Pauline Gardiner (b. 1947), former New Zealand politician
Pauline Garon (1900–1965), US actor
Pauline Gedge (b. 1945), Canadian novelist
Pauline Green (b. 1948), European politician
Pauline Gregg (1909–2006), British historian
Pauline Hanson (b. 1954), Australian politician
Pauline Heßler (b. 1998),  German ski jumper
Pauline Holdstock (b. 1948), British-Canadian writer
Pauline Hopkins (1859–1930), African-American novelist
Pauline von Hügel (1858-1901), Italian-born Austrian baroness; British writer, philanthropist
Pauline Jacobus (1840–1930),  US studio potter
Pauline-Marie Jaricot (1799–1862), French founder of the Society of the Propagation of the Faith and the Living Rosary Association.
Pauline Jewett (1922–1992), Canadian politician
E. Pauline Johnson (1861–1913), Canadian writer and performer
Pauline Johnson (actress) (1899–1947), English film actor
Pauline Julien (1928–1998), Canadian singer
Pauline Kael (1919–2001), US film critic
Pauline Koner (1912–2001), US dancer and choreographer
Pauline Konga (b. 1970), retired Kenyan runner
Pauline Kingi (b. 1951), Māori community leader
Pauline LaFon Gore (1912–2004), mother of former US Vice President Al Gore and the wife of former US Senator Albert Gore Sr.
Pauline Lafont (1963–1988), French actor
Pauline Gracia Beery Mack (1891–1974), US chemist
Pauline Maier (1938–2013), US historian
Pauline Mailhac (1858–1946), Austrian-German opera singer
Pauline Félicité de Mailly (1712–1741), French noble
Pauline Marois (b. 1949), Canadian politician
Pauline Mills McGibbon (1910–2001), Canadian politician
Pauline McLynn (b. 1962), Irish actor
Pauline McNeill (b. 1962) Scottish politician
Pauline Melville (b. 1948), Guyanese-born writer and actor
Pauline Menczer (b. 1970), Australian surfer
Pauline Mendoza (b. 1999), Filipina actress and model
Pauline von Metternich (1836–1921), Austrian socialite
Anna Milder-Hauptmann (1785–1838), Austrian singer
Pauline Moran (b. 1947), English actor
Pauline Musters (1876–1895), the shortest woman ever recorded
Pauline Ngan Po-ling, Chinese politician
Pauline Neville-Jones, Baroness Neville-Jones (b. 1939), former BBC Governor and Chairman of the British Joint Intelligence Committee
Pauline Newstone, Canadian voice actor
Pauline Nyiramasuhuko (b. 1946), Rwandan politician and war criminal
Pauline Oliveros (1932–2016), US composer and accordionist
Pauline O'Neill (disambiguation)
Pauline O'Neill (sister), first president of Saint Mary's College in Notre Dame, Indiana
Pauline O'Neill (suffrage leader) (1865–1961), suffrage leader, Arizona state legislator, and widow of Buckey O'Neill
Princess Pauline of Orange-Nassau {1800–1806), Dutch noble
Pauline Pantsdown, stage name of Australian satirist Simon Hunt
Pauline Parker (b. 1938), New Zealander murderer
Pauline Parmentier (b. 1986), French tennis player
Pauline-Euphrosine Paul (1803–1877), French ballet dancer also known as Madame Montessu
Pauline Periwinkle (1863-1916), American journalist, poet, teacher, feminist
Pauline Phillips (1918–2013), US writer of Dear Abby
Pauline Picard (1947–2009), Canadian politician
Pauline Polaire, Italian actor
Paulina Porizkova (b. 1965), Czech model and actress
Pauline Prior-Pitt, British poet
Pauline Quirke (b. 1959), English actress
Pauline Reade (d. 1963), British murder victim
Pauline Réage, pseudonym of French journalist Anne Desclos (1907–1998)
Pauline Richards, Canadian political candidate
Pauline Robertson (b. 1968), retired Scottish field hockey player
Pauline Roland (1805—1852), French feminist and socialist
Pauline Dohn Rudolph (1865–1934), US painter
Pauline Sabin (1887–1955), US prohibition repeal leader and Republican party official
Pauline Scanlon, Irish singer 
Pauline Schmidt (1865–1944), Danish magician
Pauline Agassiz Shaw (1841–1917), US philanthropist and social reformer
Pauline Small (1924–2005), Crow tribal politician
Pauline Smith (1882–1959), South African novelist
Pauline Stainer (b. 1941), English poet
Pauline Starke (1901–1977), US actor
Pauline Anna Strom, US composer and synthesist better known as Trans-Millenia Consort
Pauline Thompson (1942–2012), New Zealand painter
Pauline Thys (c.1836–1909), French composer and librettist
Pauline Tompkins (1918–2004), president of Cedar Crest College
Pauline, Lady Trevelyan {1816–1866), English painter
Pauline van der Wildt (b. 1944), retired Dutch swimmer
Pauline Vanier (1898–1991), Canadian vice-regal consort
Pauline (singer) (Pauline Vasseur) (b. 1988), French singer 
Pauline Viardot (1821–1910), French singer
Pauline Wayne (b. ca 1906), US President Taft's cow
Pauline Payne Whitney (1874–1916), US heiress
Pauline of Württemberg (disambiguation)
Pauline Therese of Württemberg (1800–1873), daughter of Duke Louis of Württemberg and third wife of King William I of Württemberg
Princess Pauline of Württemberg (1810–1856), daughter of Prince Paul of Württemberg and second wife of William, Duke of Nassau
Princess Pauline of Württemberg (1877–1965), daughter of William II of Württemberg and wife of William Frederick, Prince of Wied
Pauline A. Young (1900–1991), African-American teacher, activist, and humanitarian

Fictional characters
Ms. Pauline Fleming, a character from the 1988 film Heathers, and it's musical and TV adaptations
Pauline Fowler, a character from the British soap opera EastEnders, portrayed by Wendy Richard

See also
Pauline (disambiguation) (other meanings of the word Pauline)
The Perils of Pauline, a series of films
Paulina
Pavlina

External links 
 Lexikoneintrag über den Namen Pauline at vorname.com 
 Entry at onomastik.com 

French feminine given names